The  Green Bay Packers season was their 42nd season overall and their 40th season in the National Football League. The team finished with an 8–4 record under second-year head coach Vince Lombardi to win the Western Conference and a berth in the NFL championship game. It was the Packers' first appearance in the title game since winning it in 1944. After a Thanksgiving Day loss at Detroit, the Packers won their final three games, all on the road, to win the crown.

The championship game was against the Eastern Conference champion Philadelphia Eagles (10–2), played at Franklin Field in Philadelphia on Monday, December 26.

In a close game, the Packers led in the fourth quarter, but lost 17–13. Green Bay returned to the title game the next two seasons and won both.

Offseason

NFL draft

Yellow indicates a future Pro Bowl selection

Regular season

Schedule

 Thursday (November 24: Thanksgiving Day), Saturday (December 10 & 17) 

Game summaries

Week 1 vs Bears

Week 2

Week 3

Playoffs

Standings

Roster

Postseason

NFL Championship Game

First quarter
GB – Paul Hornung  20-yard FG
Second quarter
GB – Hornung  23-yard FG
Phi – Tommy McDonald 35-yard pass from Norm Van Brocklin (Bobby Walston kick)
Phi – Walston 15-yard FG
Third quarter
No scoring
Fourth quarter
GB – Max McGee 7-yard pass from Bart Starr (Hornung kick)
Phi – Ted Dean 5 run (Walston kick)

Awards and records
Tom Moore, NFL Kickoff Return Leader
 Paul Hornung set an NFL record for scoring 176 points, a record that since has been broken

References

Sportsencyclopedia.com

Green Bay Packers seasons
Green Bay Packers
Green